Harumi is a Japanese given name.

Harumi may also refer to:

Places

 Harumi, Tokyo, a district of Chūō, Tokyo
 Harumi Futo, site of the 2020 Olympic Games village

Fictional characters

 Harumi Chono, a character in the anime series Paranoia Agent
 Princess Harumi, a character in the animated series Ninjago: Masters of Spinjitzu

Music 

 Harumi (album), a 1968 album by a musician of the same name

See also 
 Said al-Harumi (1972–2021), Israeli politician